Carlo Garavaglia (born August 4, 1952 in Milan) is an Italian association football manager, currently the manager of Sempione Half 1919.

He made his debut in Serie A on 26 November 2006, when he replaced the head coach Mario Beretta who was ill. He also managed many teams in Serie C.

Career
1993-1995  Pavia

1995-1996  Solbiatese

1996-1998  Pro Patria

1998-1999  Voghera

1999-2000  Saronno 

2000-2001  Novara

2006-2008  Siena (assistant manager)

2008-2009  Lecce (assistant manager)

2010-      Como

2022-      Sempione Half 1919

References

Italian football managers
Living people
Como 1907 managers
A.C. Milan non-playing staff
1952 births
Sportspeople from Milan